Marquette Catholic High School is a private, co-educational, college prep school in Michigan City, Indiana. It is run along the principles of the Roman Catholic Diocese of Gary. Marquette offers dual credit courses, and AP credit opportunities.

IHSAA State Championships
Marquette has won 12 state titles: nine in volleyball, one in boys basketball, and two in girls basketball:
 Volleyball (1999, 2000, 2001, 2004, 2005, 2006, 2007, 2008, 2009)
 Boys Basketball (2014)
 Girls Basketball (2018, 2019)

References

External links
 School website

Roman Catholic Diocese of Gary
Catholic secondary schools in Indiana
Private high schools in Indiana
Michigan City, Indiana
Educational institutions established in 1886
Schools in LaPorte County, Indiana
1886 establishments in Indiana